Kartar Singh Jhabbar (1874-20 November 1962) was a Sikh leader known for his role in the Gurdwara Reform Movement of the 1920s.

Kartar Singh was born to Teja Singh in the Jhabbar village of Sheikhupura District in Punjab (British India). His grandfather Mangal Singh was in the service of Maharaja Ranjit Singh. He received religious education (1906–09) at the Khalsa Updeshak Mahavidyalaya, a training institution for Sikh preachers at Garjakh.

In 1909, Kartar Singh became a preacher and later joined the Singh Sabha Movement. In 1919, he was arrested for anti-Government protests following the Jallianwala Bagh massacre. He was awarded a sentence in the Andaman jail, but was later released after the announcement of the royal clemency.

In the 1920s, Kartar Singh led the Gurdwara Reform Movement, which aimed at transferring the control of Sikh gurdwaras from traditional clergy (Udasi mahants) and Government-appointed managers to the Shiromani Gurdwara Parbandhak Committee (SGPC). In 1920, a jatha (volunteer group) led by him seized the control of the Babe di Ber gurdwara in Sialkot. He also played an important role in the SGPC's takeover of the Harmandir Sahib (Golden Temple), the holiest shrine of the Sikhs. He further helped the Akalis seize the control of Gurdwara Panja Sahib (Hasan Abdal, November 1920), Gurdwara Sacha Sauda (Chuhar Kana, December 1920), Gurdwara Sri Tarn Taran Sahib (January 1921) and Gurdwara Guru ka Bagh (near Amritsar, January 1921).

In 1921, Kartar Singh was arrested for protesting against the Nankana massacre, and again in 1924 for taking part in various Akali movement demonstrations. He was released in December 1928, because of poor health. He and his associates were involved in securing for SGPC the possession of properties attached to various gurdwaras, in accordance with the Sikh Gurdwaras Act, 1925.

After the partition of India in 1947, Kartar Singh migrated to Habri village of Karnal district (in present day Kaithal district of Haryana). He was engaged in resettlement of refugees, and died in Habri, in 1962.

Film and Literature
Kartar Singh Jhabbar was shown in a Punjabi movie Saka - The Martyrs of Nankana Sahib where Mukul Dev was shown doing his lead role and the entire movie was based on Saka Nankana Sahib and Gurdwara Reform Movement

References 

Indian Sikh religious leaders
Punjabi people
Sikh politics
1874 births
1962 deaths